January 1 is a 1984 Indian Tamil-language film directed by Manivannan, starring Vijayakanth, Sulakshana and Sathyaraj. It was released on 6 December 1984, and became a success.

Plot

Cast 
Vijayakanth
Sulakshana
Sathyaraj
Tara
Janagaraj
Anuradha
Vinu Chakravarthy
Gandhimathi
Senthil
Chinni Jayanth
Loose Mohan
Oru Viral Krishna Rao
Periya Karuppu Thevar
Super Subbarayan

Production 
January 1 was the first of several collaborations between Manivannan and Sathyaraj.

Soundtrack 
The music was composed by Ilaiyaraaja. The song "Nee Oru Pathini Illai" attained popularity.

Release and reception 
January 1 was released on 6 December 1984. Jeyamanmadhan of Kalki gave the film a negative review, criticising the lack of masala, story and thrills but appreciated the last ten minutes. Despite this, it became a success.

References

External links 
 

1980 films
1980s Tamil-language films
1984 films
Films directed by Manivannan
Films scored by Ilaiyaraaja